Blalock may refer to:

 Blalock (surname)
 Blalock, Georgia, an unincorporated community
 Blalock, Oregon, a former community in the United States
 Lake Blalock, reservoir in Spartanburg County, South Carolina

Houses
 Blalock House, historic home in Venice, Florida, United States
 Robert L. Blalock House, historic home in Lenoir County, North Carolina
 Dr. Nathan M. Blalock House, historic home near Raleigh, Wake County, North Carolina

See also
 Blalock–Taussig shunt, surgical procedure used to increase pulmonary blood flow
 Blalock–Hanlon procedure, a form of heart surgery